WPLP-LP ("Bulldog 93.3") is a radio station licensed to Athens, Georgia, United States that airs an alternative rock format.  The station's slogan is The Sound of Athens. The station was started by Paul Francis and began as a not-for-profit, grassroots station. The station operates from the Fred Building on College Avenue in downtown Athens. The station plays limited commercials. The station is known for encouraging local music and musicians by asking for submissions of local music and playing the song of the winner of the Athens Area High School Battle of the Bands.

Bulldog 93.3 was criticized by Athens community members in February 2018 for owner Paul Francis' response to an advertising request from the United Campus Workers of Georgia.

In January 2021, the station was fined $10,000, after admitting to airing commercials with prohibited promotional language.

References

External links
Bulldog 93-3 online

2014 establishments in Georgia (U.S. state)
Radio stations established in 2014
PLP-LP